The 2013 North American Lacrosse League season was the first and only season in the history of the NALL. The season began January 5, 2013 and ended  March 16, 2013. 
Originally scheduled as a 12-game season for each team, the season was cut to ten games for the Baltimore Bombers, Boston Rockhoppers and Kentucky Stickhorses.  The Rhode Island Kingfish season was initially cut to 6 road games due to issues securing the Bradford R. Boss Arena. Eventually, due to the Bombers folding after only seven games, the rest of the regular season was canceled on March 11, and the championship game was moved to March 16.

Season Table

Current standings
Grey indicated that the Baltimore Bombers folded before the season completed. Record shown is their record before they folded.

Milestones & events

Preseason
The first league sponsored combine was held on October 13, 2012.
Due to the impact of Hurricane Sandy, the 2012 player draft, originally scheduled for October 29, 2012, was postponed until November 1, 2012.

Regular season
The first overtime game was between the Baltimore Bombers and Boston Rockhoppers on January 12. The Bombers won 17–16, which was their first win in franchise history.
The February 9 game between the Baltimore Bombers and Rhode Island Kingfish was postponed due to Winter Storm Nemo.
For a second time in the 2013, a game featuring the Rhode Island Kingfish was postponed due to a snow storm. The February 23 game between the Rhode Island Kingfish and Boston Rockhoppers will be played March 9.
On March 8, 2013 it was officially reported the Baltimore Bombers had folded. General manager and head coach, Hunter Francis noted that "...the economics didn’t work." This news initially broke on Laxdirt.com and later on their Facebook page. Just two days before, the Bombers posted about giveaway at the game scheduled for March 10.
On March 11, the Kentucky Stickhorses created an event page on Facebook stating they would take on the Boston Rockhoppers in the 2013 NALL Championship on March 16 at Freedom Hall. This move canceled the few remaining games left in the season and moved the NALL finals a week earlier than scheduled.

Championship
Saturday, March 16, 2013 at 7:00PM EST, at Freedom Hall in Louisville, Kentucky

See also
 2013 in sports

References

North American Lacrosse League